Shadows of Paris is a 1924 American silent drama film directed by Herbert Brenon and starring Pola Negri, Charles de Rochefort, and Huntley Gordon. The screenplay involves a young woman who rises from an apache dancer to become a wealthy woman in post-World War I Paris. It was based on the play Mon Homme by Francis Carco and André Picard.

Plot
As described in a film magazine review, Paris in 1918 knows Claire only as "The Blackbird," the Queen of the Apaches. Her lover Fernand is reported killed at the front during the War. She then masquerades as a society woman and becomes the wife of Raoul Grammont, the Minister of the Interior, but occasionally visits her old haunts in disguise. Fernand reappears as an Apache leader and they meet again. After several adventures, Claire comes to see that Fernand is only a monster of greed, and that her affections belong only to the man who made her an honorable wife. Fernand is shot and killed by her husband's secretary, Georges de Croy. Although he knows the truth about Claire and Fernand, he tells Raoul only that he shot a burglar. Claire then confesses all to her husband and is forgiven.

Cast

Preservation
With no prints of Shadows of Paris located in any film archives, it is a lost film. Only a minute of footage survives in the Paramount compilation short Fashions in Love (1936).

References

Bibliography
 Basinger, Jeanine. Silent Stars. Wesleyan University Press, 2000.

External links

Lobby poster

1924 films
1924 drama films
Silent American drama films
1920s English-language films
Films directed by Herbert Brenon
American silent feature films
Films set in Paris
American films based on plays
American black-and-white films
Lost American films
1924 lost films
Lost drama films
1920s American films